Raja Arjun Singh (1829 – 1890) was a prominent leader of the Indian Rebellion of 1857 in Singhbhum. He served as the Raja of Porahat in Singhbhum, (now in chakradharpur, Jharkhand). Arjun Singh had great influence over Kols (also called Hos) who looked upon him with the "reverence due to the deity". He was the son of Raja Achyut Singh. During his rule the Dewan was Jagabandhu Patnaik (Jaggu Dewan).

References

History of Jharkhand
Revolutionaries of the Indian Rebellion of 1857